The Happy Ending is a 1931 British drama film directed by Millard Webb and starring George Barraud, Daphne Courtney and Alfred Drayton. Its plot concerns a father who deserted his family some years before returning home only to find his wife has told his children and neighbours that he died as a hero when he abandoned them. A silent version, of The Happy Ending had been made in 1925 based on the same play by Ian Hay. It was made at Lime Grove Studios. The film's sets were designed by Andrew Mazzei.

Cast
 George Barraud as Dennis Craddock 
 Daphne Courtney as Mollie Craddock 
 Alfred Drayton as Life of the party 
 Anne Grey as Mildred Craddock 
 Benita Hume as Yvonne 
 Cyril Raymond as Anthony Fenwick 
 Irene Russell as Wife 
 Dolores Judson as Passenger

References

Bibliography
Wood, Linda. British Films, 1927–1939. British Film Institute, 1986.

External links
 

1931 films
1931 drama films
Films based on works by Ian Hay
Films directed by Millard Webb
British drama films
Gainsborough Pictures films
Films shot at Lime Grove Studios
British black-and-white films
1930s English-language films
1930s British films